Terranuova Bracciolini is a comune (municipality) in the Province of Arezzo in the Italian region Tuscany, located about  southeast of Florence and about  northwest of Arezzo.

Terranuova Bracciolini borders the following municipalities: Castelfranco Piandiscò, Castiglion Fibocchi, Laterina Pergine Valdarno, Loro Ciuffenna, Montevarchi,  San Giovanni Valdarno.

Known historically as just Terranuova, the municipality was the birthplace in 1380 of the famed early humanist Poggio Bracciolini, for which it was renamed in 1862.

References

External links
 Official website 

Cities and towns in Tuscany